The following is a list of endemic bird areas of the world, as defined by Birdlife International - see main article (Endemic Bird Area).

North and Central America

South America

Africa, Europe and the Middle East

Continental Asia

South-east Asian islands, New Guinea and Australia

Pacific Ocean islands

See also
 List of secondary endemic bird areas of the world

References
 Endemic Bird Areas of the World: Priorities for Biodiversity Conservation Alison J. Stattersfield, Michael J. Crosby, Adrian J. Long and David C. Wege (1998) Birdlife International 
The lists of EBAs above, and all associated data, are sourced from information presented in this work

Endemic Bird Areas of the world, List of
Endemism